This is a partial discography of Lucia di Lammermoor, an opera by Gaetano Donizetti. It premiered on September 26, 1835 at the Teatro di San Carlo in Naples.

Original Italian version, 1835: audio recordings

Original Italian version, 1835: video recordings

Revised French version, 1839: audio recordings

Revised French version, 1839: video recordings

References
Notes

Sources
Lucia di Lammermoor Discography on Operadis

Opera discographies
Operas by Gaetano Donizetti